The 2011 Volvo World Match Play Championship was the 46th Volvo World Match Play Championship played. It was held 19–22 May, with the champion receiving €800,000. The format was 24 players split into eight pools of three, with the top two in each pool progressing to the knock-out stage. It was an official money event on the European Tour.

Course

Format
The 24 players were split into eight pools of three, with the players seeded by their Official World Golf Ranking. Within each pool, every player played each other in a round-robin format over 18-hole matches. Points were awarded based upon win (2), tie (1) or loss (0). The two leading players from each pool advanced to the knock-out stage. In case of ties, sudden-death playoffs were used to determine rankings.

Participants

Pool play
Source

1st – Westwood
2nd – Baddeley
3rd – Hansen

1st – Schwartzel (Schwartzel wins at second extra hole.)
2nd – Edfors
3rd – Jiménez (Jiménez eliminated on first extra hole.)

1st – Kaymer
2nd – Noh
3rd – Yang

1st – Colsaerts
2nd – McIlroy
3rd – Goosen

1st – McDowell
2nd – Vegas
3rd – Oosthuizen

1st – Quirós
2nd – Kjeldsen
3rd – Casey

1st – Donald
2nd – Fisher
3rd – Moore

1st – Molinari
2nd – Poulter
3rd – Lawrie

Playoffs
Source

Prize money breakdown
Source:

Notes and references

External links
Official site
Coverage on the European Tour's official site

Volvo World Match Play Championship
Volvo World Match Play Championship
Volvo World Match Play Championship
Golf tournaments in Spain
May 2011 sports events in Europe